The Dingle Group is a Devonian lithostratigraphic group (a sequence of rock strata) in the Dingle peninsula, Munster, Ireland. The name is derived from the town of Dingle and the peninsula to which it gives its name where the strata are exposed on mountainsides and in coastal cliffs.

Lithology and stratigraphy 
The Group comprises several different sandstone formations of Devonian age including cross-bedded and pebbly sandstones, conglomerates, siltstones and mudstones.

References 

Geologic groups of Europe
Geologic formations of Ireland
Devonian System of Europe
Pragian Stage
Emsian Stage
Sandstone formations
Siltstone formations
Conglomerate formations
Fluvial deposits